"All I Want" is a song by American alternative rock band Toad the Wet Sprocket from their 1991 album, Fear. "All I Want" was Toad the Wet Sprocket's first successful song. It became one of their most well-known songs, reaching the top 20 on the US Billboard Hot 100 and the Canadian RPM Top Singles chart.

Composition
On the song's content, singer Glen Phillips said, "It's very much about how fleeting any kind of epiphany is. It's all about the moment passing very, very quickly and how there's a desire to hold onto it. That would be a constant, but it comes and it goes and it goes very quickly."

Track listings

US CD and cassette single, UK 7-inch single
 "All I Want" – 3:15
 "All She Said" – 3:47

Australian CD single
 "All I Want" – 3:15
 "Hold Her Down" – 3:07

European CD single
 "All I Want" – 3:15
 "Hold Her Down" – 3:07
 "Come Back Down" – 3:19
 "One Little Girl" – 3:26

Charts

Weekly charts

Year-end charts

Cover versions
Post-hardcore band Emery recorded a cover of the song, which was included on the 2006 compilation Punk Goes 90's.

In popular culture
The song was featured in the TV series Doogie Howser, M.D., Dawson's Creek, Reunion and Homeland.

In 2005, the song was added onto the Nickelodeon soundtrack, Zoey 101: Music Mix as the 10th track, along with other songs that were featured in Nickelodeon's Zoey 101.

References

1991 songs
1992 singles
Columbia Records singles
Songs written by Glen Phillips (singer)
Toad the Wet Sprocket songs